Wellspring may refer to:

Wellspring Capital Management, a $2 billion private equity firm based in New York City
Wellspring Academies,  therapeutic schools for overweight and obese youngsters
Wellspring Retreat and Resource Center, a counseling center specializing in the treatment of former members of abusive religious groups and cults
The Wellspring, an American folk rock duo